The Little Five Conference was a short-lived intercollegiate athletic football conference that existed from 1912 to 1917. The league had members in the state of Illinois.

Champions

1912 – Lake Forest
1913 – Lake Forest
1914 – Monmouth (IL)
1915 – Monmouth (IL)
1916 – Monmouth (IL)
1917 – Monmouth (IL)

See also
List of defunct college football conferences
Illinois Intercollegiate Athletic Conference

References

Defunct college sports conferences in the United States
College sports in Illinois